Great Wolf Lodge is a resort and indoor waterpark of  located in Gurnee, Illinois near Six Flags Great America and Gurnee Mills. The resort is operated by Great Wolf Resorts. It was originally opened as Key Lime Cove and was listed as the "Official Resort of Six Flags Great America". The resort is located about an hour away from Chicago and less than an hour from Milwaukee.

History

KeyLime Cove operations (2008–2017) 
Around 2007, the resort, formerly named KeyLime Cove was constructed. It opened the following year, with a water park. It had a tropical theme around the resort.

Nine years later, in 2017, the hotel announced its closure. It was announced that it would be owned by Great Wolf Lodge and would be having an extensive renovation throughout the whole hotel.  This also ended the partnership with Six Flags Great America, though, as the shuttle entrance to the park removed its signage, and it did not reference the hotel after its removal.

Great Wolf Resorts operations (2017–present) 
Renovations on the new Great Wolf Lodge finished around summer of 2018. The renovated hotel opened on July 1, 2018. It featured a new forest and wolf theme. There was a new expansion in the water park by adding new water slides near the original slide complexes. The exterior was painted a new brown and peach color. It also incorporated the MagiQuest game throughout the park.

In 2020, the hotel closed down for the COVID-19 pandemic. The hotel was used for housing navy recruits during April for quarantining purposes. The hotel reopened on August 24, 2020, with temperature checks.

Entertainment

Attractions

Level 1 

 Wiley's Waterpark – A water park with a variety of water slides and pools named after Wiley the Wolf, the mascot of Great Wolf Lodge.
 Rustic Ridge Climbing Wall – A 21-foot climbing wall.
 Howl in One Mini Golf – A mini golf game with nine courses.
 Northern Lights Arcade – An arcade with prizes and games.
 Olivers Mining Co. – Sand-sifting experience hunt for a variety of gemstones.
 Ten Paw Alley – Family-based bowling alley.
 MagiQuest – An interactive fantasy roleplaying game.

Level 2 

 Howler's Peak Ropes Course – An obstacle course elevated over Howl in One Mini Golf and Rustic Ridge Climbing Wall.

Dining

Level 1 

 Hungry as a Wolf – An Italian restaurant that serves pizza, pasta and more Italian food.
 Timbers – An American restaurant with burgers, salads and sandwiches.
 The Outpost – Bar with craft beers and signature cocktails.
 Campfire Kitchen – À la carte dishes that serves both breakfast and dinner.
 The Watering Hole – Located in Wiley's Waterpark, The Watering Hole sells poolside soft drinks, cocktails and beer.

Level 2 

 Barnwood – An American & bar restaurant with locally-sourced food and beverages.
 Ben & Jerry's – An ice cream shop.
 Dunkin' – A popular donut and coffee shop.

Shopping

Level 1 

 Great Wolf Candy Company – A candy shop.
 Paddle Bay Outfitters – Swimwear shop.

Level 2 

 Camp H.O.W.L Kids Store – "The Great Wolf Kids" characters themed merchandising.
 Build-A-Bear Workshop – Chain company that sells stuffed animals.
 Buckhorn Exchange – Vacation souvenirs, gifts and other essentials.

See also
 List of water parks
Six Flags Great America
Gurnee Mills

References

Further reading
 

Resorts in the United States
Gurnee, Illinois
Water parks in Illinois
Buildings and structures in Lake County, Illinois
Tourist attractions in Lake County, Illinois
Buildings and structures completed in 2008
Hotels established in 2008